Bayard Rustin High School is a high school of the West Chester Area School District, in Westtown Township, Chester County, Pennsylvania.

Communities served by West Chester Rustin include sections of Westtown Township, West Chester borough, East Bradford Township, East Goshen Township, Thornbury Township of Chester County, Thornbury Township of Delaware County, and West Goshen Township.

The newest high school in the district, it is named after openly gay civil rights activist Bayard Rustin, himself a West Chester native. Construction began in 2003 and the school opened in 2006. Rustin was named one of Newsweek's top 500 high schools in America in 2011. As of 2020, Rustin was ranked number 854 in National Rankings and #24 in Pennsylvania schools according to U.S. News & World Report.

Demographics

Academic Competitions

Science Olympiad 
Rustin's Science Olympiad team started the same year the school opened, 2006–2007, and has made nationals five times, in 2012, 2015, 2016, 2017, and 2019 placing 14th, 18th, 13th, 21st, and 16th respectively.

Rustin also hosts an invitational for middle school teams every year, one of the largest on the east coast.

References

External links
Official School Site
Official Boys Lacrosse Site
Official Rustin Invitational Scilympiad Site
WCBYHS at U.S. News & World Report

Public high schools in Pennsylvania
Educational institutions established in 2006
Schools in Chester County, Pennsylvania
West Chester, Pennsylvania
2006 establishments in Pennsylvania